Kōrō, Koro or Kourou (written: 光郎, 光朗, 耕郎 or 浩郎) is a masculine Japanese given name. Notable people with the name include:

, Japanese diplomat
, Japanese photographer
, Japanese long jumper
, Japanese politician

Japanese masculine given names